Joel Pettyfer (born 21 February 1987), is an English professional wrestler, better known by his ring name Joel Redman. Pettyfer is best known for his work on the independent circuit in the United Kingdom, where he is a former Unified British Tag Team Champion alongside Mark Haskins in International Pro Wrestling: United Kingdom and Real Quality Wrestling and was a regular competitor in the Frontier Wrestling Alliance. He is also known for working in WWE's developmental territory NXT under the ring name Oliver Grey, where he was one half of the inaugural NXT Tag Team Champions along with Adrian Neville, often collectively known as British Ambition.

Professional wrestling career

Early career (2006)

Pettyfer started wrestling with Devon Junior Wrestling Alliance, where he wrestled under his own name, before going to Revolution British Wrestling and other UK indie promotions. His first appearance in the newly named Varsity Pro Wrestling (formerly RBW's southwest branch) was in Crediton, Devon where he would wrestle as Joel Redman in a match where he would be defeated by American wrestler Spiro from San Antonio, Texas on 26 January 2006.

On a later VPW show, Redman attacked Aviv Maayan after Maayan's match. "The Twisted Genius" Dean Ayass then made his way to the ring and introduced Redman as his new protégé. On VPW's first Charity Show, Maayan got his chance to face Redman which Maayan won. However, this would not end their feud as once again after Mayaan lost a match to Jorge Castano, Redman and Ayass would once again come to the ring and attack Mayaan. After this attack Ayass would grab the microphone and tell the fans that on the next show back in Horndean, Joel Redman would face Aviv Mayaan once again.

Redman's feud with Aviv Mayaan would not just be contained to VPW. After becoming an alumnus of the training school, Redman went on to train in the FWA Academy where he would face off with Mayaan once again, touring a Title tournament this time coming on the losing end of the match. After dominating several opponents throughout the end of 2006 in FWA:A, Redman would team up with FWA:A Champion LT Summers to defeat Mark Sloan and Ollie Burns for the FWA:A Tag Team Championships.

Premier Promotions (2006–2012)
Over the year, Redman has become a regular for Premier Promotions and made his debut in 2006 teaming with Kris Kay to defeat Chris Andrews and Sam Andrews. In late 2007, Redman participated in a one night tournament losing to Danny Collins in the semi finals. In early 2008, the PWF Mid-Heavyweight Championship was vacated by Doug Williams and to find a champion there was a round robin tournament which Redman was involved in, however, he would lose all his matches and was eliminated. Throughout 2008, Redman had made an impression on Premier Promotions with his technical prowess and spirit to never give up, this culminated on 4 September when Redman defeated Marty Scurll in the finals of the Ian Dowland Trophy. With this win he took on Ricky Knight for the PWF Mid-Heavyweight Championship but lost via count out. Towards the end of 2009, a year Redman spent away from Premier Promotions, he returned to take part in the Ken Joyce Trophy 2009 but would lose to legendary British wrestler, Robbie Brookside, in the semi final. In March 2010, he won a one night tournament and would win another in April. Redman would once again become a regular for Premier Promotions and towards the end of the year defeated Justin Starr to win the Ken Joyce Trophy 2010. Following this win, on 27 February 2011, he defeated UK Dominator in a British rules match for the vacant PWF International Championship. As the reigning champion, Redman entered the Worthing Trophy 2011 and reached the final where he was defeated by Danny Garnell. Redman teamed up with Jonny Storm to take on Kris Kay and UK Dominator in a British rules match for the vacant PWF Tag Team Championship which they lost. Redman would vacate the PWF International Championship when he was signed by World Wrestling Entertainment and moved to their developmental system NXT Wrestling.

UK "New School" promotions (2007–2009, 2015–2017)
Redman formed a team with Mark Haskins known as The Thrillers, on their debut match together they lost to The South Coast Rock 'n' Roll Express (Ian Logan and Jake McCluskey) on 14 July 2007 which involved a special guest referee. The team would go on a losing streak for the next few months and even lost to The Kartel (Sha Samuels and Terry Frazier) in a match for the IPW:UK Tag Team Championship. The Thrillers won their first match as a tag team in a dark match by defeating JP Monroe and Jules Lambrini on 27 January 2008.

The team debuted for Real Quality Wrestling on 16 February 2008 and defeated the Maximum Head (Dan Head & Max Voltage) and would next month beat The Lost Boys (Danny Darko and Jo FX). After their two successful matches they challenged The Damned Nation (Cameron Kraze and Dragon Aisu) on 26 April for the RQW Tag Team Championship which they won.

The Thrillers returned to International Pro Wrestling: United Kingdom on 4 May triumphant with tag team gold in the form of RQW Tag Team Championship only to lose the championship The Kartel (Sha Samuels & Terry Frazier) in a championship unification match which also involved IPW:UK Tag Team Championship. The team debuted for One Pro Wrestling losing to BritRage (Mark Sloan & Wade Fitzgerald). However they would beat The Kartel on 28 September for the Unified British Tag Team Championship. The Thrillers would then debuted for Westside Xtreme Wrestling at the beginning of 2009 and won a wXw Tag Team Championship contendership match defeating Adam Polak and Lazio Fe. With that win, they challenged Doug Williams and Martin Stone for the wXw Tag Team Championship the following month, but were unable to win the title.

Upon their return to IPW:UK, The Thrillers lost the Unified British Tag Team Championship to The Leaders of The New School (Marty Scurll and Zack Sabre Jr.). The Thrillers tried to regain the championship on two separate occasions, the first ending in DQ and the second where they were defeated clean in a tables, ladder and chairs match.

On 15 February 2015, Martin Stone was confirmed to have returned to the United States for another company, so Joel Redman had to choose another partner to substitute for Stone. At High Stakes, this partner was revealed to be Mark Haskins, not only successfully defending the titles, but reuniting once more. After Haskins was injured in mid-2015, Jake McCluskey stepped in as a replacement partner at Summer Sizzler, however, Redman and McCluskey were unable to defeat The Kartel (Sha Samuels and James Castle) and subsequently lost the British Tag Team Championship. In 2016, Redman began teaming with Charlie Garrett, and the duo successfully defeated The Kartel on 12 June 2016 at Angle vs Sabre Jr. to end their reign at two days short of one year.

Their first defence took place the next month at Summer Sizzler, defeating Jody Fleisch and Jonny Storm, Jake McCluskey and Kieran Bruce and The Legion of Lords (Gideon Grey and Rishi Ghosh) in a fatal four way to retain. Redman and Garrett successfully defended the championships once again in November, defeating NJPW's Los Ingobernables de Japón (Evil and Bushi) at Global Wars UK. Redman and Garrett (now known as Charlie Sterling) made two successful defences in January 2017, first defeating The London Riots (James Davis and Rob Lynch) at Live at the Cockpit 12, and War Machine (Hanson and Raymond Rowe) at High Stakes.

Irish Whip Wrestling (2008–2009)

Redman made his debut for Irish Whip Wrestling on 5 July 2008 in a four corners match for the IWW International Heavyweight Championship which Mandrake won, the match also involved Doug Basham and Vic Viper. After competing only a few matches in 2008, the next year he became a regular at the promotion. He took on LA Warren for the IWW Zero Gravity Championship and Mandrake for the IWW International Heavyweight Championship on multiple occasions but would also come up short. In mid-2009, Redman had formed a partner ship with Captain Rooney which for their short time together worked, winning all their matches, however Rooney would turn on Redman and joined up with Bingo Ballance. The Redman and Ballance feud culminated with Ballance coming out on top. Redman's last match for IWW was against Mandrake for the IWW International Heavyweight Championship, once again losing.

WWE

Florida Championship Wrestling (2012)
In a March 2012 interview, Pettyfer stated that he had signed a contract with WWE following two try-out matches and was waiting for his visa to be approved before he could travel to Florida to join WWE's developmental territory. Pettyfer made his debut under the Joel Redman name at a Florida Championship Wrestling (FCW) live event on 20 June 2012, teaming with Conor O'Brian, against Garrett Dylan and Rick Victor in a losing effort. On the 28 June 2012 FCW live event, Pettyfer competed under his real name teaming with CJ Parker in a losing effort against Big E Langston and Lincoln Broderick. Pettyfer would make his singles debut at the 29 June 2012 FCW live event against Mason Ryan in a losing effort.

NXT (20122014)
On 19 September 2012, Pettyfer made his NXT televised debut using the ring name Oliver Grey and lost two sparring matches to Kassius Ohno.

In early 2013, Grey began teaming with Adrian Neville, and the two entered the tournament to determine the inaugural NXT Tag Team Champions. They defeated 3MB (Heath Slater and Drew McIntyre) and Kassius Ohno and Leo Kruger en route to the final, where they defeated The Wyatt Family (Luke Harper and Erick Rowan) on the 13 February episode of NXT, originally taped on 31 January. Grey then suffered a torn anterior cruciate ligament and was written off television in March 2013 after an attack by the Wyatt Family. Whilst Grey was injured he was replaced as tag champion by Bo Dallas, with whom Neville lost the title to the Wyatt Family on 2 May.

After more than a year off television, Grey returned on the 10 April 2014 episode of NXT, and promptly lost his first match back against Camacho on the 17 April episode. On 30 April 2014, it was reported that Grey had been released by WWE. His final TV appearance on the 8 May 2014 episode of NXT (taped before his release) was participating in a 20-man battle royal to determine the number one contender for the NXT Championship, only to be the first one eliminated by Brodus Clay.

All Star Wrestling (2017-present)
On 22 October 2017 in Ipswich, Redman as Oliver Grey defeated Harlem Bravado for the All Star Wrestling "Superslam" British Heavyweight Championship.  In February 2020 in Gravesend, he lost the title to Niwa, a Maori from New Zealand.  Due to his country's COVID 19 restrictions, Niwa was unavailable to defend his championship until 2022 at which point he returned to the UK and Grey regained the title in Telford, defending it in numerous rematches with Niwa for the remainder of the year.  One such rematch on 16 October 2022 in New Brighton was attended by legendary masked wrestler Kendo Nagasaki as a ringside judge.  During the match, Nagasaki used his "powers" to prevent Niwa seizing the championship belt to use as a weapon. Niwa and Grey/Refman have taken their feud to other UK promotions including Rumble Wrestling.

All Japan Pro Wrestling (2019) 
On 4 April 2019, Redman debuted for the Japanese promotion All Japan Pro Wrestling, teaming with Dylan James, Gianni Valletta and Sam Adonis to defeat Ryouji Sai, Yoshitatsu, Yuma Aoyagi and Zeus. He took part in the 2019 edition of the Champion Carnival tournament, finishing second to last in the B-block with 6 points. Redman challenged for his first title in All Japan on 24 October 2019 when he and fellow WWE alumni Yoshitatsu challenged Zeus and Ryoji Sai for the AJPW World Tag Team Championships. Redman and Tatsu, now working under the tag team name of One World, would also enter the 2019 edition of the Real World Tag League in November that year.

Personal life
From an early age, Pettyfer played rugby and participated in judo. He attended East Devon College. While wrestling in England, Pettyfer simultaneously worked as a forester.

Championship and accomplishments
  All Star Wrestling
 "Superslam" British Heavyweight Championship (2 times, current)
Devon Wrestling Association
DWA Trophy Championship (2 times) 
DWA Trophy Championship Tournament (2009)
Evolution Wrestling
Evolution Heavyweight Championship (3 times)
Full Force Wrestling
FFW Championship (1 time, current)
FWA Academy
FWA Academy Tag Team Championship (1 time) – with LT Summers
FWA Tag wars Tournament - with LT Summers (2006)
International Pro Wrestling: United Kingdom
IPW:UK Tag Team Championship (1 time) - with Doug Basham, Mark Haskins and Ricky Hype
Premier Promotions
PWF International Championship (1 time)
Ian Dowland Trophy (2008)
Ken Joyce Trophy (2010)
Pro Evolution Wrestling
Pro-EVW Heavyweight Championship (2 times)
Pro Wrestling Pride
PWP Catch Division Championship (1 time)
PWP Tag Team Championship (1 time, current) – with Joshua Knott
Pro Wrestling Illustrated
PWI ranked him #205 of the top 500 singles wrestlers in the PWI 500 in 2013
REACH Wrestling
REACH Championship (1 time)
REACH Journey for Gold Tournament (2019)
Real Quality Wrestling
RQW Tag Team Championship (1 time) – with Mark Haskins
Revolution Pro Wrestling
RPW Undisputed British Tag Team Championship (4 times) - with Doug Basham, Iestyn Rees, Mark Haskins and Ricky Hype (1), Martin Stone (1), Mark Haskins (1) and Charlie Garrett (1)
 United X Conquer Wrestling
 UXC Heavyweight Championship (1 time, current)
Wrestling in Europa
Southern Countries Trophy (2010)
WWE
NXT Tag Team Championship (1 time, inaugural) – with Adrian Neville
NXT Tag Team Championship Tournament (2013) – with Adrian Neville

References

External links
 NXT profile
 Cagematch profile

1987 births
21st-century professional wrestlers
English male professional wrestlers
Living people
Sportspeople from Exeter
NXT Tag Team Champions
Undisputed British Tag Team Champions